Wartling  is a village and civil parish in the Wealden District of East Sussex, England, between Bexhill and Hailsham, ten miles (16 km) west of the latter at the northern edge of the Pevensey Levels. The parish includes Wartling itself and Boreham Street, two miles (3 km) north-east on the A271 road.

Wartling is mentioned in the Domesday Book, when there was a chapel there. The current church, dedicated to St Mary Magdalene and linked with that at Herstmonceux, was built in the 13th century, probably on the same site as the chapel. As with many villages on the Weald, the iron industry flourished here in the 17th and 18th centuries.

Notable people
John Richardson Major, Vicar of Wartling 1846 to 1851
H.J.C. Turner, born in the Wartling Place the Rectory at Wartling in 1850, the son of the curate, played in the first rugby international in 1871.

See also
RAF Wartling

References

External links

Villages in East Sussex
Civil parishes in East Sussex
Wealden District